Josiah Titus Young (February 25, 1831 – November 11, 1907) was an American newspaper editor and politician.

Born in Johnson County, Indiana, Young moved with his family to Monroe County, Iowa. During the American Civil War, Young served in the 8th Iowa Volunteer Infantry Regiment. Young was the editor and publisher of The Monroe County Sentinel and The Albia Union newspapers. He also was a lawyer. Young served as clerk for the Monroe County District Court and was a Republican. From 1873 to 1879, Young served as Iowa Secretary of State. In 1880, Young served as mayor of Albia, Iowa. Young then served in the Iowa House of Representatives from 1890 to 1892. Young died at his house in Albia, Iowa after being in poor health.

Notes

1831 births
1907 deaths
People from Albia, Iowa
People from Johnson County, Indiana
People of Iowa in the American Civil War
Editors of Iowa newspapers
Iowa lawyers
Secretaries of State of Iowa
Mayors of places in Iowa
Republican Party members of the Iowa House of Representatives
19th-century American politicians